The Oratorio Society of Queens is a non-profit membership organization which performs the choral pieces and is the oldest performing arts institution in the borough of Queens, New York City. David W. Close is the Artistic Director and Conductor.

Established in 1927 by Flushing residents, the Oratorio Society of Flushing competed with the prestigious Oratorio Society of New York, founded 54 years earlier. In 1985 the Society incorporated as the Oratorio Society of Queens (OSQ), covering members throughout the borough. Today the membership is borough-wide and even includes several Bronx and Nassau County residents.

OSQ is a charter member of both the Queens Council on the Arts and the Flushing Council on Culture & the Arts. Throughout its history, OSQ has been non-sectarian, and membership is open to anyone.

History 

The Oratorio Society of Queens, originally known as the Oratorio Society of Flushing, was founded in 1927.  The idea of a community-based mixed voice chorus, dedicated to sharing the aesthetic values oratorio music expresses, was conceived by Mrs. Edward Keefe. She was initially assisted by John W. Norton, organist and choirmaster of St. George's Episcopal Church; and Edward M. Franklin, a leading layman of the church.

The charter members were drawn from Flushing's several old, prominent families, but in keeping with the democratic spirit historically associated with Flushing, membership was open to all.  Among other members was Bertha Parsons, the last owner-resident of John Bowne House before it was opened as a museum of early Flushing.  On May 12, 1927 a chorus of 100 voices directed by John Norton performed Felix Mendelssohn's "Hymn of Praise" to critical acclaim before an audience of 900 at Flushing High School.

There would be carol singing at Flushing Hospital, after which the singers would sing at a founder's home and partake of a lovely party in the festively decorated house.  Local merchants provided financial support and articles for door prizes at fundraising events.  The Society was supported by member dues, subscribers, bake sales and fundraising dinners.  Mrs. Maude Wilson was made an honorary member in the early 1930s because she contributed the entire proceeds of her Annual Party and Dahlia Flower Show to the Society.  Fundraising was always a necessity even though concert accompaniment was originally by organ or piano.

The chorus, subsequently conducted by Herbert Stavely Sammond, and later by Lawrence Rasmussen, performed two major concerts a year until 1943, when Mr. Rasmussen was called to service in World War II.  Rehearsals were suspended until 1946 when Mr. Rasmussen returned.  David Katz, founder of the Queens Symphony, succeeded Mr. Rasmussen in ensuing years, dispelling the notion that the works of the great masters are too deep and profound for the average person to understand and appreciate.  By its seventy-fifth anniversary in 2003, Maestro David Close had, for thirty-five years, successfully continued the traditions established by the founding members.

The expansion to full orchestra accompaniment with professional vocal soloists created the need for increased funding. Although it hosts its annual Fundraising Benefit Event each April, the society depends upon grants from corporate and public funds in addition to traditional ticket sales and subscriptions.
 
In 1985, the Society changed its name to the Oratorio Society of Queens in recognition of membership deriving from all parts of Queens.  The entire Borough was learning that one need not travel to Manhattan for classical music, one could go to The Performing Arts Center at Queensborough Community College, St. Andrew Avellino Church, the Reformed Temple of Forest Hills, Trinity Lutheran Church, Christ the King High School, Flushing Meadows-Corona Park under the Unisphere, Seuffert Bandshell in Forest Park, Bayside High School, Colden Center, or various venues in Brooklyn and Long Island.  The Society appeared at the 1939 New York World's Fair and in later years at Lincoln Center.

Notable members 
 Margaret Harshaw, contralto, became a Metropolitan Opera singer.
 John Easterlin, tenor, has become a world-renown singer recently singing at The Lyric Opera in Chicago.
 Cornelius L. Reid, baritone, became a leading voice teacher in New York City with a number of books published to his credit.
 Maestro David Katz founded the Queens Symphony Orchestra.

Awards and honors 

 Charter Member of the Queens Council on the Arts 1967
 Certificate of Appreciation from the Queens Borough Public Library to David Close & the Flushing Oratorio Society (sic) for a presentation at a Holiday Program at the Hillcrest Branch, April 4, 1985
 Certificate of Appreciation from the Flushing Council on Culture and the Arts to the Oratorio Society of Flushing - its 1983 Award for Achievement, 12/8/82
 Congressional Record - Hon. Gary L. Ackerman 1987: "In these times when materialism seems to take precedence over many of the esthetic aspects of society, it is most important that the arts and the needs of the human spirit are not neglected.  Through the fine efforts of the Oratorio Society of Queens, we may be sure that it will not be."
 Congressional Record - Hon. Gary L. Ackerman 2002
 Letters from Debra Markell-Kleinert, Queens Borough Director, Community Assistance Unit  and from Michael Bloomberg, Mayor of the City of New York “ welcoming everyone to Queensborough Community College for the 75th Holiday Concert of the Oratorio Society of Queens, 12/22/02"

Conductors 

Spring 1927 - John Norton
Winter 1927 - Dr. Clarence Dickinson
Spring 1928 - Spring 1938  =  Herbert Stavely Sammond
Winter 1938 - Spring 1952  =  Lawrence Rasmussen
Winter 1952 - Winter 1953  -  No conductor
Spring 1954 - Spring 1956  =  Donald Comrie
Winter 1956 - Spring 1959  =  Frederick Heyne
Winter 1959 - Winter 1961  =  Elizabeth DeMartini
Spring 1962 - Spring 1963  =  James McEvers
Winter 1963 - Spring 1968  =  Warren H. Brown
Winter 1968 - Winter 1969  =  David Katz
Spring 1970–Present  = David Close

References 

<ref>Queens Library Archives/LID/Oratorio Society of Queens Collections Finding Aids/

External links 
 Oratorio Society of Queens Official Website

Choral societies
Non-profit organizations based in New York City
Musical groups from Queens, New York
Musical groups established in 1927